Rangemore is a rural locality in the Toowoomba Region, Queensland, Australia.

Geography 
Rangemore is an area between North Maclagan and Rangemore to the northwest and between Marriages Road and Cooyar Rangemore Road. The principal land use is farming.

History 
Rangemore State School opened on 17 March 1913. In 1917 it was downgraded to a half-time provisional school in conjunction with King's Tent Provisional School (meaning the two schools shared a single teacher). In 1918 King's Tent Provisional School closed and Rangemore once again became a full-time state school. It was finally closed circa 1962.

In the  Rangemore had a population of 3 people.

References 

Toowoomba Region
Localities in Queensland